Heart of palm is a vegetable harvested from the inner core and growing bud of certain palm trees, most notably the coconut (Cocos nucifera), juçara (Euterpe edulis), açaí palm (Euterpe oleracea), palmetto (Sabal spp.), and peach palm. Harvesting of many uncultivated or wild single-stemmed palms results in palm tree death (e.g. Geonoma edulis). However, other palm species are clonal or multi-stemmed plants (e.g. Prestoea acuminata, Euterpe oleracea), and moderate harvesting will not kill the entire clonal palm. Heart of palm may be eaten on its own, and often it is eaten in a salad.

There are palm varieties that have become domesticated farm species as an alternative to sourcing from wild palms. The main variety that has been domesticated is Bactris gasipaes, known in English as peach palm. This variety is the most widely used for canning. Peach palms are self-suckering and produce multiple stems, with up to 40 on one plant. This lets producers lower costs by harvesting several stems from a plant while avoiding the death of the palm. Another advantage is that the peach palm has been selectively bred to eliminate the thorns of its wild cousins. Since harvesting is still labor-intensive, palm hearts are regarded as a delicacy.

Names
Major local names for heart of palm include palm cabbage or palmetto in Florida and Trinidad; palmito in South and Central America; ubod in the Philippines; củ hủ dừa in Vietnam; cœur de palmier in French; corazón de palma or col de palma in Spanish; coração de palma or palmito in Portuguese; and cuore di palma in Italian.

Nutrition 

Hearts of palm are rich in fiber, potassium, iron, zinc, phosphorus, copper, vitamins B2, B6, and C. They are ranked as a "good" source of protein, riboflavin, and potassium, and as a "very good source" of dietary fiber, vitamin C, folate, calcium, iron, magnesium, phosphorus, zinc, copper, and especially, manganese, along with being a good ratio between omega-3 and omega-6 fatty acids. The high sodium content noted on the chart for hearts of palm relates to the canned product; it is not present in the fresh product.

Cultivation 
Harvesting and eating heart of palm is traditional in the cultures of Southeast Asia and South and Central America, pre-dating the colonial era. The species used depend on the region.

In Southeast Asia, the dominant source of hearts of palm are coconuts (Cocos nucifera). Other palms species used include rattans (Calamus spp. and Daemonorops spp.), fishtail palms (Caryota spp.), areca palm (Areca catechu), Linospadix spp., Arenga spp., sago palms (Metroxylon sagu), and buri palms (Corypha spp.), among others.

In Central and South America, the dominant species used are juçara palms (Euterpe edulis), açaí palms (Euterpe oleracea), and pejibaye palms (Bactris spp.). Other species used include sabal palmettos (Sabal spp.), grugru palms (Acrocomia aculeata), royal palms (Roystonea spp.), Astrocaryum spp.,  maripa palms (Attalea maripa), urucuri palms (Attalea phalerata), cohune palms (Attalea cohune), hesper palms (Brahea spp.), and Syagrus spp., among others. In South America, Euterpe precatoria (in Peru and Bolivia), Euterpe edulis (in Brazil), and Prestoea acuminata (in Ecuador) were formerly harvested commercially on a large scale, but currently not any longer due to overharvesting. A 2000 case study in the journal Biotropica proposed that Euterpe edulis could be sustainably grown and harvested. Today, commercially available palmito in South America is typically derived from wild Euterpe oleracea and cultivated Bactris gasipaes.

Cultivation has also spread to South Asia, Africa, and other parts of the world, utilizing native palms like Ravenea madagascariensis, Phoenix canariensis, Lodoicea maldivica, and Borassus aethiopum, among others. Based on a 1987 article, peach palms were previously shown to have stretched out from Bolivia to Honduras as well as the Amazon River into Central America, however recent studies into their conservation have estimated that their geographical distribution actually extends into the Caribbean and other continents.

As of 2008, Costa Rica was the primary source of fresh palm hearts in the U.S. Peach palms are also cultivated in Hawaii,  and now have limited distribution on the mainland, primarily to the restaurant trade. Florida's wild Sabal palmetto or cabbage palm was once a source of hearts of palm but is now protected by conservation law.

Harvesting 
When harvesting the cultivated young palm, the tree is cut down, and the bark is removed, leaving layers of white fibers around the center core. During processing, the fibers are removed, leaving the center core or heart of palm.  The center core is attached to a slightly more fibrous cylindrical base with a larger diameter. The entire cylindrical center core and the attached base are edible. The center core is considered more of a delicacy because of its lower fiber content. Arecaceae was brought up in a 2003 article with regard to its long-winded harvesting process. It is mentioned that this palm reaches full maturation within 8–10 years and that the complete removal of the heart requires the ruination of the entire plant. While there are concerns about the negative impacts of harvesting palm hearts, further conservation efforts could be explored using the research on the outcome of adaptations to moisture within the grown environment on the life span of heart of palm seeds.

See also 
 Banana pith
Palmyra sprout
Deckenia nobilis
Sago

References 

Edible palms
Stem vegetables
Latin American cuisine
Southeast Asian cuisine